The canton of Sète is an administrative division of the Hérault department, southern France. It was created at the French canton reorganisation which came into effect in March 2015. Its seat is in Sète.

Composition

It consists of the following communes:
Sète

Councillors

In March 2016, François Liberti resigns. He is replaced by his substitute, Sébastien Andral.

Pictures of the canton

External links
 Canton of Sète Web site

References

Cantons of Hérault